Jatayu is a demigod in the Hindu epic Ramayana, who has the form of either an eagle or a vulture. He is the younger son of Aruṇa and his wife Shyeni, the brother of Sampati, as well as the nephew of Garuda. He is also an old friend of King Dasharatha, Rama's father.

Legend

Flight towards the sun 
During their youth, Jatayu and his elder brother, Sampati, under a wager, flew towards Surya, the solar deity. Jatayu, careless due to his youthfulness, outflew his brother, and entered the Sūryamaṇḍala, the orbit of the sun, during noon. Due to the blazing heat of Surya, his wings started to get scorched. In a desperate bid to rescue his brother, Sampati flew ahead of him, spreading his wings wide open to shield him. As a consequence, it was Sampati who had his wings burnt, descending towards the Vindhya mountains. Incapacitated, he spent the rest of his life under the protection of a sage named Nishakara, who performed a penance in the mountains. Jatayu never met his brother again.

Battle against Ravana 
The Araṇya-Kāṇḍa of the Ramayana mentions that Jatayu is the "King of Vultures"(gṛdhrarāja). According to the epic, the rakshasa Ravana was abducting the avatar of Lakshmi, Sita, when Jatayu tried to rescue her. Jatayu fought valiantly with Ravana, but as Jatayu was very old, Ravana soon defeated him, clipping his wings, and Jatayu descended upon the earth. Rama and Lakshmana, while searching for Sita, chanced upon the stricken and dying Jatayu, who informed them of the battle with Ravana, and told them that Ravana had headed south. Jatayu then died of his wounds and Rama performed his final funeral rites.

Veneration

According to local lore of Kerala, it is believed that Jatayu fell on the rocks in Chadayamangalam in the Kollam district of Kerala after his wings were clipped off by Ravana. The name "Chadayamangalam" is said to be derived from "Jatayu-mangalam".
Lepakshi in Andhra Pradesh is also attributed as the place where Jatayu fell after being wounded by Ravana. Rama is said to have commanded the bird to rise, saying Le Pakshi (literally: "Get up, Bird" in Telugu), hence the name for the village.
Vijayaraghava Perumal temple in Thiruputkuli, Tamil Nadu is associated with Jatayu because the presiding deity, Vijayaraghava Perumal (a form of Rama), is believed to have performed the last rites of Jataya at this place. The water body where Jatayu fell is called Jatayu Tirtham.
Thirupullabhoothangudi Temple in Pullabhoothangudi, Tamil Nadu is also claimed as the location of Jatayu's last rites.

See also
 Garuda
 Sampati
 Jatayu Nature Park

References

Bibliography
 Dictionary of Hindu Lore and Legend by Anna Dhallapiccola
 Ramayana by C. Rajagopalachari

External links
 The Hindu. Rama’s paratva.

Characters in the Ramayana
Hindu legendary creatures
 
Mythological birds of prey